.

He choreographed an event at Madison Square for Indian Prime Minister Narendra Modi. Khinchi also worked on movies such as Love Ke Chakkar Mein and Ye Stupid Pyar. 

Rajeev khinchi is a renowned international Fashion and Film choreographer and a show director with an experience of more than 25 years in the industry .

Rajeev Khinchi is a 2 time national award winner. He won Rashtriya Rajiv Gandhi Award for Best Choreographer in 2015. Asian World Film Festival in Los Angeles, California, United States. He was in the main choreography team for films such as Dostana, Veer, What's Your Raashee?, We Are Family, Aśoka, Kuch Kuch Hota Hai, Kaho Naa Pyaar Hai, Mohabbatein, and Kabhi Khushi Kabhie Ghamto name few. Khinchi is also a global business advisor for Whistling Woods, the largest filmmaking school in Asia, founded by Subhash Ghai.

Rajeev khinchi was a judge for Jhalak Dikhlaja Dance reality show in Dubai which was for colors channel.

Rajeev khinchi is a popular face on social media with visibility of 125 million on one of his video which is one the highest record on social media .

Rajeev khinchi is also known as international fashion and beauty pageant director ,who has directed international shows like miss nyc , miss Connecticut,miss uae and  miss intercontinental to name few . 
He has walked and choreographed various fashion weeks around the globe . 

Rajeev khinchi has directed ,choreographed and conceptualised various music videos and ad films  .His song Sayyian featuring Chitrangda singh for Vinod bhanushali hitz music label was appreciated for its choreography, concept and creativity .

Rajeev has also choreographed on ground sporting events like IPL, CCL ,BCL and hockey league .

Rajeev khinchi has now joined hands with international music and film label called the Spark musik movies.

Rajeev Khinchi has also joined politics with RPI party of Ramdas Athawle, as their all india youth leader .

References

External links 

Indian choreographers
Indian film choreographers